The Rangiya-Murkongselek section is a  long railway line connecting Rangiya in Kamrup district with Murkongselek in Dhemaji district in the Indian state of Assam. The entire section is under the jurisdiction of Northeast Frontier Railway.

History

Tezpur-Balipara Light Railway 
A  extension to this line was made from Rangapara, then a station on this line, to Borjuli Tea estate as well. However, this line was closed to traffic on 1908.

This line continued to operate until 1952 before it was taken over by the North Eastern Railway and was converted to metre gauge.

Singri-Panchnoi River Tramway 
The Singri-Panchnoi River Tramway was a privately owned narrow gauge line that ran northwards from Singri Ghat on the Brahmaputra River to the environs of Hugrajuli. The line opened in 1919 to transport tea down to the Singri Ghat.

Eastern Bengal Railway 
Tracks were laid at Rangiya as a part of the extension of Eastern Bengal Railway's main metre gauge line from Sarbhog to Amingaon in 1909. The Tangla extension was built from Rangiya to Tangla in 1912. The line was extended to Rangapara North station on the Tezpur-Balipara Light Railway by 1933.

Post-independence 
Post-independence the metre-gauge line was extended from Rangapara North to Murkongselek. The Balipara-Bhalukpong branch line was built in 1989–90.

Conversion to broad gauge
The conversion of this section to broad gauge started on 2007–08. The Rangiya-Rangapara North-Dekargaon section was converted and opened for traffic in 2013. The Tezpur railway station was abandoned however owing to its proximity to Brahmaputra river which caused frequent flooding and Dekargaon railway station became the terminus of the branch line. The Rangapara North-Harmuti & Harmuti-North Lakhimpur sections were converted in 2014 and the North Lakhimpur-Sripani section was converted and opened in 2015. The final stretch between Sripani and Murkongselek along with the Balipara-Bhalukpong branch line was converted and opened to traffic in May 2015 as well.

Branch lines 
The Balipara-Bhalukpong branch line was built in 1989–90. The line was converted to broad gauge in May 2015.

The Harmuti-Naharlagun branch line was announced in 2008 and was opened in 2014 as a part of the Rangiya-Murkongselek gauge conversion project. This was declared a national project considering that it connected Itanagar, the capital of Arunachal Pradesh, with the Indian railway network.

The Bogibeel Bridge was sanctioned in 1997 and work started on it in 2002. It was intended to link the Rangiya-Murkongselek section on the north bank of the Brahmaputra with the Lumding-Dibrugarh section in the South bank. The work was completed on 2018 and the first train across the bridge was flagged off by Prime Minister Narendra Modi.

Proposed projects and extensions

Three national projects of strategic importance are proposed in this section primarily focusing on providing connectivity with Arunachal Pradesh. A broad gauge railway track is proposed from the existing rail head at Bhalukpong to Tawang via Tenga & Dirang. Another Lakhimpur-Bame-Silapathar line is proposed from North Lakhimpur to Silapathar via Bame & Aalo The terminal station of the section is also expected to be moved from Murkongselek to Parshuram Kund in Arunachal Pradesh, via Pasighat and Tezu and to further connect it to the Lumding–Dibrugarh section at Rupai.

This also entails the building of a new railway bridge across the Brahmaputra River.

References

5 ft 6 in gauge railways in India
Rail transport in Assam
Railway lines opened in 1900